The Rothermere American Institute is a department of the University of Oxford dedicated to the interdisciplinary and comparative study of the United States of America and its place in the world. Named after the Harmsworth family, Viscounts Rothermere, it was opened in May 2001 by former US President Bill Clinton. It hosts conferences, lectures and seminars in the fields of American history, politics, foreign relations, and literature. Guests and speakers have included Queen Elizabeth, former US President Jimmy Carter, Jesse Jackson, Justice Sandra Day O'Connor and Lord Patten of Barnes. The institute hosts four of the university's chairs and two visiting professorships.

The institute's current director is Adam I. P. Smith. It offers visiting fellowships to scholars of American studies, scholarships to study for a doctorate at Oxford in US history or politics, and various travel awards. Oxford University's annual Esmond Harmsworth Lecture in American Arts and Letters is held there.

See also
American Studies in Britain

References

External links
Rothermere American Institute Homepage

Departments of the University of Oxford
Educational institutions established in 2001
American studies
2001 establishments in England